Linear prediction is a mathematical operation where future values of a discrete-time signal are estimated as a linear function of previous samples.

In digital signal processing, linear prediction is often called linear predictive coding (LPC) and can thus be viewed as a subset of filter theory. In system analysis, a subfield of mathematics, linear prediction can be viewed as a part of mathematical modelling or optimization.

The prediction model 
The most common representation is

The error generated by this estimate is

where  is the true signal value.

These equations are valid for all types of (one-dimensional) linear prediction. The differences are found in the way the predictor coefficients  are chosen.

For multi-dimensional signals the error metric is often defined as

where  is a suitable chosen vector norm.

Estimating the parameters 
The most common choice in optimization of parameters  is the root mean square criterion which is also called the autocorrelation criterion. In this method we minimize the expected value of the squared error , which yields the equation

for 1 ≤ j ≤ p, where R is the autocorrelation of signal xn, defined as

,

and E is the expected value.  In the multi-dimensional case this corresponds to minimizing the L2 norm.

The above equations are called the normal equations or Yule-Walker equations. In matrix form the equations can be equivalently written as

Another, more general, approach is to minimize the sum of squares of the errors defined in the form

On the other hand, if the mean square prediction error is constrained to be unity and the prediction error equation is included on top of the normal equations, the augmented set of equations is obtained as

Specification of the parameters of the linear predictor is a wide topic and a large number of other approaches have been proposed. In fact, the autocorrelation method is the most common and it is used, for example, for speech coding in the GSM standard.

Solution of the matrix equation  is computationally a relatively expensive process. A faster algorithm is the Levinson recursion proposed by Norman Levinson in 1947, which recursively calculates the solution. In particular, the autocorrelation equations above may be more efficiently solved by the Durbin algorithm.

In 1986, Philippe Delsarte and Y.V. Genin proposed an improvement to this algorithm called the split Levinson recursion, which requires about half the number of multiplications and divisions. It uses a special symmetrical property of parameter vectors on subsequent recursion levels. That is, calculations for the optimal predictor containing  terms make use of similar calculations for the optimal predictor containing  terms.

Another way of identifying model parameters is to iteratively calculate state estimates using Kalman filters and obtaining maximum likelihood estimates within expectation–maximization algorithms.

For equally-spaced values, a polynomial interpolation is a linear combination of the known values. If the discrete time signal is estimated to obey a polynomial of degree  then the predictor coefficients  are given by the corresponding row of the triangle of binomial transform coefficients. This estimate might be suitable for a slowly varying signal with low noise.

See also 
 Autoregressive model
 Linear predictive analysis
 Minimum mean square error
 Prediction interval
 Rasta filtering

References

Further reading

External links 
 PLP and RASTA (and MFCC, and inversion) in Matlab

Signal estimation
Statistical forecasting